Kurungulam Keelpathi is a village in the Thanjavur taluk of Thanjavur district, Tamil Nadu, India.

Demographics 

As per the 2001 census, Kurungulam Keelpathi had a total population of 3460 with 1689 males and  1771 females. The sex ratio was 1049. The literacy rate was 55.79.

References 

 

Villages in Thanjavur district